The Kimmel Kabins were a tourist camp in Grand Teton National Park.  The camp was built in 1937 by J.D. and Lura Kimmel with a rustic lodge and eleven cabins on either side of Cottonwood Creek south of Jenny Lake. The camp is the only remaining example of a motor court-style camp in Grand Teton out of as many as twelve former establishments.  The camp eventually featured a store with a post office.

The Kimmels sold the strategically located property in 1944 in exchange for a life estate. After Lura Kimmel's death in 1962 the cabins were used as seasonal residences for National Park Service employees and the other buildings were removed.

The Kimmel Kabins were placed on the National Register of Historic Places on April 23, 1990.

See also
 Historical buildings and structures of Grand Teton National Park

References

External links

Auto Camps at Grand Teton National Park
Grand Teton Historic Resource Study: Tourists National Park Service
Kimmel Kabins at the Wyoming State Historic Preservation Office

Hotel buildings on the National Register of Historic Places in Wyoming
National Park Service rustic in Wyoming
Log cabins in the United States
Buildings and structures in Grand Teton National Park
Historic districts on the National Register of Historic Places in Wyoming
National Register of Historic Places in Grand Teton National Park
Log buildings and structures on the National Register of Historic Places in Wyoming
1937 establishments in Wyoming